La vera vita di Antonio H. (internationally released as The True Life of Antonio H.) is a 1994 Italian mockumentary film directed by Enzo Monteleone and loosely inspired to real life events of Alessandro Haber. For this film Haber won the Silver Ribbon for best actor.

Cast 
 Alessandro Haber: Antonio Hutter 
 Bernardo Bertolucci: himself  
 Giuliana De Sio: herself
 Ennio Fantastichini: himself
 Massimo Ghini: himself 
 Nanni Loy: himself 
 Marcello Mastroianni: himself
 Mario Monicelli: himself
 Maria Amelia Monti: herself 
 Michele Placido: himself
 Gabriele Salvatores: himself 
 Paolo Taviani: himself
 Vittorio Taviani: himself
 Adriana Innocenti: Antonio's Mother

See also  
 List of Italian films of 1994

References

External links

1994 films
Films directed by Enzo Monteleone
Italian comedy films
1990s mockumentary films
1994 comedy films
1994 directorial debut films
1990s Italian-language films
1990s Italian films